Saeed Ahmed (born 1 October 1937) is a Pakistani preacher and former cricketer who is the member of Tablighi Jamaat after retirement. 

He played in 41 Test matches between 1958 and 1972. He was born in 1937 at Jalandhar in what was then British Punjab, part of British India and educated at Government Islamia College in Lahore. He played as a right-handed middle order batsman with a powerful drive and bowled off-breaks. He is the brother of another cricketer Younis Ahmed.

Saeed made his Test début on 17 January 1958 against the West Indies at Bridgetown. He made 65 in the second innings, at one stage partnering with Hanif Mohammad who went on to make 337. Saeed finished the series with 508 runs. He went on to captain his side in three drawn Tests in 1968–69 but his career ended in controversial circumstances when he declared himself unfit for the third Test against Australia in 1972 due to what he claimed was a back injury. In the previous Test, he had been involved in a heated altercation with Dennis Lillee and the Pakistan management was sceptical about his injury.

Personal life
He married renowned businesswoman Begum Salma Ahmed, a relative of Pakistani diplomat Shahryar Khan, and became involved in the business. 

In 1980, he quit his cricket and business careers and joined Tablighi Jamaat as a preacher. His sister, Shagufta, married Pakistani cricketer Sarfaraz Nawaz for a brief time.

Records
 Fastest Pakistani Cricketer to reach 1,000 test runs (20 innings).

References

External links

1937 births
Living people
Pakistan Test cricketers
Cricketers from Jalandhar
Pakistan Test cricket captains
International Cavaliers cricketers
Recipients of the Pride of Performance
Pakistani cricketers
Pakistan Universities cricketers
Punjab University cricketers
Lahore cricketers
Pakistan International Airlines cricketers
Karachi Whites cricketers
Marylebone Cricket Club cricketers
Karachi Blues cricketers
Karachi cricketers
Public Works Department cricketers
Sindh cricketers
Punjab (Pakistan) cricketers
Central Zone (Pakistan) cricketers
Tablighi Jamaat people
Pakistani Sunni Muslims
Government Islamia College alumni